"Deep Breath" is the first episode of the eighth series of the British science fiction television programme Doctor Who, first broadcast on BBC One and released in cinemas on 23 August 2014. It was written by showrunner and executive producer Steven Moffat and directed by Ben Wheatley. The episode was watched by 9.17 million viewers and received positive reviews from critics.

The episode stars Peter Capaldi in his first full episode as the Twelfth Doctor, alongside Jenna Coleman as his companion Clara Oswald.  It also features Neve McIntosh, Catrin Stewart, and Dan Starkey reprising their roles as Madame Vastra, Jenny Flint, and Strax. Capaldi's predecessor, Matt Smith, also appears in a cameo.

Plot
A dinosaur materialises in Victorian London and spits out the TARDIS onto the banks of the River Thames. The newly regenerated Twelfth Doctor, and Clara, emerge from the TARDIS. While the Doctor rests at the Paternoster Gang's residence, the Silurian Madame Vastra confronts Clara about her prejudiced attitude to the Doctor's changed face. The dinosaur bursts into flames; Vastra confirms that this is not the first recent incident of spontaneous combustion. The Doctor and Clara separately investigate.

The next morning, the Doctor roams the back streets for answers, recognising his current face from before. Both Clara and the Doctor find an advertisement in a newspaper directing them to meet at a specific restaurant. They learn that neither of them planted the message. They discover that the restaurant is part of a spaceship that crashed in the past and is filled with humanoid robots. Beneath the restaurant, they see a dormant male cyborg with half a face. The Doctor surmises the Half-Face Man is a robot replacing his mechanical parts with biological ones.

Upon Clara's prompting, the awakened Half-Face Man reveals that he is trying to reach the "promised land" by prolonging his life via parts replacements and he killed the dinosaur to use her biological material for his computer. The Half-Face Man deploys his escape pod—a hot-air balloon made of human skin—lifting him and the Doctor into the sky. The Doctor claims that the Half-Face Man--the other robots' control node--has replaced his components so many times that he no longer exists in his original form and does not want to continue his existence. The Doctor then warns that either the Half-Face Man will have to kill himself, or the Doctor will be forced to kill him to protect the humans. The other robots go lifeless; the Half-Face Man is impaled on the spire of Big Ben.

The Doctor suspects the unseen "woman in the shop" who placed the advertisement in the paper and who gave Clara the Doctor's phone number is keeping the two together. Clara expresses misgivings about the new Doctor's character and is unsure about continuing to travel with him. Clara gets a phone call from the Eleventh Doctor, made moments before his regeneration, encouraging her to stay. Clara agrees. The Half-Face Man awakens and meets a woman called Missy, who tells him he has reached the promised land.

Continuity 
Madame Vastra's line, "Well, here we go again", refers to Brigadier Lethbridge-Stewart's utterance as the Third Doctor regenerates into the Fourth Doctor in Planet of the Spiders (1974). The Doctor remarks how his new face is similar to another he has seen, recalling how the Tenth Doctor met a man named Caecilius in "The Fires of Pompeii" (2008), also played by Capaldi. The call from the Eleventh Doctor to Clara is shown from the Eleventh Doctor's perspective from his final moments before regenerating on the planet Trenzalore, and using footage from "The Time of the Doctor".  The cyborgs' concealed ship is named the SS Marie Antoinette, the 'sister ship of the SS Madame de Pompadour''' - although the Doctor himself struggles to remember the connection, the latter ship and the concept of cyborg crew harvesting their human counterparts to repair their ship are witnessed in Series 2's fourth episode "The Girl in the Fireplace" (2006).

Towards the end of the story, the Doctor speculates on the identity of the person that wrote the "Impossible Girl" newspaper ad, suspecting it is the same person who gave Clara the number for the TARDIS phone in "The Bells of Saint John" (2013). The closing dialogue between Clara and the Doctor about coffee, and the Doctor's inability to pay for them, recalls a similar exchange about chips between the Ninth Doctor and Rose Tyler at the conclusion of "The End of the World" (2005).

Production

Filming
Matt Smith's scene as the Eleventh Doctor was filmed on 5 October 2013, the last day of shooting for "The Time of the Doctor". Moffat had written Smith's scene prior to the rest of the episode. The readthrough for the episode was held on 17 December 2013, and shooting began at the Maltings in Cardiff on 7 January 2014. Shooting later took place at Mount Stuart Square on the 13th, Scenes were also filmed on Queen Street and on the 28th. An uncredited Rachel Talalay directed the Missy scene, as Wheatley was unavailable; she consulted him and tried to incorporate his ideas. The shoot finished on 18 February 2014.

Promotion
Steven Moffat has said that this episode would be a "big introduction" for Peter Capaldi as the Twelfth Doctor. He said that there will be "plenty of action and nonsense and jeopardy, as there ever is in Doctor Who."

On 11 August 2014 a 30-second trailer for the episode was released on Twitter.

Cast notes
Brian Miller, who plays the tramp Barney, is the widower of Elisabeth Sladen who portrayed long-time companion Sarah Jane Smith. He had previously appeared in Snakedance in Season 20, as well as playing Harry Sowersby in The Mad Woman in the Attic, an episode of The Sarah Jane Adventures, and providing Dalek voices for both Resurrection of the Daleks and Remembrance of the Daleks.

Broadcast and reception

Pre-broadcast leak
On 6 July 2014, the scripts for the first five episodes of the series (including "Deep Breath") were inadvertently leaked online from BBC Worldwide's Latin America headquarters, prompting a plea from BBC Worldwide to keep the storylines of the five episodes secret. Also leaked was a black-and-white rough cut of "Deep Breath", missing most of the visual effects but otherwise mostly complete.  The BBC blamed the leak on the fact that the files had been stored on a publicly accessible server in its new Miami-based headquarters. Steven Moffat, speaking at the London Film and Comic Con, called the leak "horrible, miserable and upsetting".

Television
The episode was a simulcast in the United Kingdom and many other countries on 23 August 2014, and was broadcast later that same day in other locations such as on BBC America. On 31 August 2014, the episode was broadcast on Prime TV in New Zealand.

Cinemas
The episode had its world premiere in Cardiff on 7 August 2014 as part of the series 8 world tour. As part of the tour, advance screenings were also held at other destinations on the tour.  As with "The Day of the Doctor", "Deep Breath" received a worldwide cinema release at participating cinemas on 23 August 2014. The episode received a midnight screening in 12 cities across the United States on 23 August, and a larger showing in 550 cinemas on 25 August.   The cinema screenings of the episode were accompanied by a five-minute prequel.

Ratings
Upon airing in its 7.50pm timeslot, the "Deep Breath" simulcast entertained an average audience of 6.79 million in the United Kingdom. The episode reached a peak of 6.96 million viewers, watched by nearly a third of all viewers on the evening of broadcast with a 32.5% audience share. The final ratings for the week, which do not include BBC iPlayer viewers but do include viewers who watched the programme within a week of its transmission, showed 9.17 million viewers (37.9% audience share) saw the episode, making it the second highest rated programme for the week on British television. This was also the highest final viewing figures for a regular series episode of Doctor Who since Matt Smith's first full episode, "The Eleventh Hour", was broadcast in April 2010, although Christmas specials and the 2013 50th anniversary special "The Day of the Doctor" had scored higher viewing figures. Its chart position meant it became only the eighth episode of Doctor Who to be one of the week's top two most viewed programmes. In terms of L+7 ratings "Deep Breath" had 10.76 million views. The episode also topped BBC iPlayer for August, getting 2.06 million requests within eight days.

In the United States, the premiere airing on BBC America had an audience of 2.19 million viewers, the highest Saturday ratings for the network and just under the highest viewership from "The Day of the Doctor" special, combining for a total of 2.6 million viewers, a significant increase from the 1.5 million that had watched the Series 7 premiere in 2012. In Australia, the episode had a total of 1.19 million viewers on ABC. In Canada, "Deep Breath" had almost 1.4 million viewers overall on Space, becoming the second most-watched broadcast ever on this channel.

Critical reception

The episode received positive reviews, with many critics praising the performances of Capaldi and Coleman, Moffat's script, and the introduction and stylisation of the new Doctor. Matt Smith's cameo, however, was met with mostly mixed reviews. The episode was nominated for the GLAAD Media Award for Outstanding Individual Episode.The Guardian responded well to the episode, labelling Capaldi's performance as "intimidating, bold and unsettling", and praising Ben Wheatley's direction in the episode's tenser moments, calling it "the stuff of true terror and wonderment". Matt Smith's cameo as the Eleventh Doctor was criticised by the Daily Mirror. However, it ultimately labelled the episode "impeccable", stating that Capaldi "has all the hallmarks of a great Doctor". Michael Hogan, writing for The Daily Telegraph, praised Moffat's writing for second guessing viewers' opinions about the new Doctor and for stating clearly that there would be no flirting for this face. Hogan notes that "the tone seemed different, too, quieter and more thoughtful – less about running down corridors holding hands, more about self-discovery and redemption." Hogan also stated that the script was similar to Sherlock, for which Moffat also wrotes, and was a bit slow in places, but still combined behind-the-sofa action with humorous comments about ITV and the Scottish Referendum.

Brian Lowry of Variety praised Moffat's script, stating that it "emphasizes storyline continuity and easing faithful viewers into the regeneration transition" and closed his review by saying "It’s a skillful tonal balance that defines the best of “Doctor Who,” and exemplifies the ethos that keeps the series going strong, nodding to the past with all eyes on the future". David Wiegand of the San Francisco Chronicle heavily praised the episode, particularly Moffat's writing, saying that his script "masterfully manipulates audience expectation". He ultimately awarded the episode a perfect 4/4 stars.

However, not all reviews were positive. Forbes'' panned the story as "strangely recessive, unheroic, [and] dull", calling both Capaldi and Coleman's characters "insipid".

The scene in which Madame Vastra and Jenny Flint exchange a kiss generated six complaints to Ofcom, with viewers criticising the BBC for promoting a "blatant gay agenda". Ofcom decided not to investigate the matter further, judging that the complaints did not "raise issues warranting investigation." The scene was removed from the Asian broadcast of the episode in order to comply with Singapore's broadcast code.

Home media

"Deep Breath" received a standalone DVD and Blu-ray release in the United Kingdom on 8 September 2014, the United States on 9 September, and Australia on 10 September. Thereafter, it was released in the Complete Eighth Series DVD and Blu-ray box set in the United Kingdom on 17 November 2014, Australia on 19 November, and in the U.S. on 9 December.

Notes

References

External links

 
 
 

Twelfth Doctor episodes
Eleventh Doctor episodes
2014 British television episodes
Television episodes written by Steven Moffat
Doctor Who pseudohistorical serials
Doctor Who stories set on Earth
Doctor Who multi-Doctor stories
Steampunk television episodes
Fiction set in the 1890s
Television episodes set in London